Xingwen County is a county in Yibin, Sichuan, China. It is located in the southern part of Sichuan province and borders Yunnan and Guizhou provinces. It has become known for its Geopark, Xingwen Stoneforest, a Karst landscape.

Climate

External links
Official website of Xingwen County Government

References

 
Counties and districts of Yibin